The Phantom of the Opera, an adaptation of the novel of the same title by Gaston Leroux, is an audio drama created by Big Finish Productions for BBC Radio 7, broadcast in December 2007.

The story was written and directed by Barnaby Edwards in four half-hour episodes. The four-part dramatization is the first to feature the original operatic sequences described in the novel, which have been freshly recorded and orchestrated by composer Tim Sutton. The play features Anna Massey, Peter Guinness, Alexander Siddig and James D’Arcy.

Barnaby Edwards announced in June 2009 the production would be relaunched, as part of a new Big Finish Classics series of literary adaptations planned for 2010–2012.

Cast and crew
The Phantom................ Peter Guinness
Christine Daaé.............. Helen Goldwyn
Raoul de Chagny.......... James D'Arcy
Mme Giry..................... Anna Massey
The Persian.................. Alexander Siddig
Philippe de Chagny........ Nick Brimble
Moncharmin.................. Tony Millan
Richard......................... Richard Earl
Lachenel/Mifroid............ Nick Wilton
Mme Valérius................ Geraldine Newman
La Carlotta................... Samantha Hughes
Meg Giry...................... Nicola Weeks

Opera sequences sung by Linda Richardson and Matthew Hargreaves.

Music by Tim Sutton

Violin by Ruth Rogers

Sound design by Matthew Cochrane

CD & booklet design by Alex Mallinson

Written, directed and produced by Barnaby Edwards

Duration: Two hours

Recording
The story was recorded on 24 and 25 September, and 4 and 12 October 2007, and released on CD in March 2008.

References

2007 audio plays
Works based on The Phantom of the Opera
Big Finish Productions